is a Japanese adventure anime series produced by Soeisha (later renamed as Sunrise). Its 26 episodes were aired on October 5, 1972, to March 29, 1973, on Fuji Television. It is the first series to be produced by Sunrise and last for a total of 26 episodes. Most of the show's episodes are split into two 11-minute segments. The only episode to just have one 22-minute story is the final episode.

Plot
The plot focused on a goby fish named Hazedon, who was the offspring of a mermaid and a blowfish. His goal was to travel the world on an adventure with his best friend, Puyan.

Characters

Episode listing

References

External links
 

1972 anime television series debuts
1973 Japanese television series endings
Fuji TV original programming
Fantasy anime and manga
Sunrise (company)